Donald Lawrence Brenneis (born February 2, 1946) is an American anthropologist and professor of anthropology at the University of California, Santa Cruz. Brenneis served as president of the American Anthropological Association (2002–2003). He became co-editor of the Annual Review of Anthropology as of 2010. He has served two terms as director of the American Council of Learned Societies.

Brenneis has worked in linguistic and political anthropology specializing in the culture and society of Fiji, particularly Fiji's Indian community. Through his work he examines the intersections of communication, performance, and power.

Education
Brenneis' father worked for the United States Forestry Service. As a result, the family lived in various locations while he was growing up, including San Francisco, Philadelphia,   Albuquerque, New Mexico and Taos, New Mexico.
In 1963, Brenneis entered Stanford University.  He spent part of 1964 as an exchange student at Keio University, Tokyo, Japan and part of 1965 in Vienna, Austria. He received his bachelor's degree in I967 and volunteered with the Peace Corps in Nepal from I967-1968.

In 1969 Brenneis married Wynne Scott Furth, a Stanford classmate and a Harvard University law student. Brenneis also entered graduate school at Harvard University where he worked with Klaus-Friedrich Koch, Keith Kernan and Claudia Mitchell-Kernan.
His doctoral advisor was Klaus-Friedrich Koch, with whom he studied conflict resolution in Fiji. 
Both Brenneis and Furth traveled to Fiji and did field work focusing on the anthropology of law and conflict. Furth's legal training and experience in municipal and administrative law has enriched Brenneis' analysis of dispute resolution. Brenneis received his Ph.D. in social anthropology in 1974 with a dissertation on  Conflict and communication in a Fiji Indian community  (1974).

Career 
Brenneis spent I973-1974 as a post-doctoral fellow in the Center for the Study of
Law and Society at the University of California, Berkeley.
He taught at Pitzer College in Claremont, California from 1973-1996, and was acting dean of the faculty in 1985.  Brenneis joined the department of  anthropology at the University of California, Santa Cruz in 1996, as professor and chair of the anthropology board of studies.

He has worked with a diaspora community in Fiji for many years, studying the connections between language, music, conflict, law, and politics,

Awards 
1969-1973, Harvard University fellow
 1976, Haynes Foundation fellow
 1976, National Endowment for Humanities scholar
 1986-1987, Pitzer College fellow
 2017, Franz Boas Award for Exemplary Service to Anthropology, American Anthropological Association

Works

References

1946 births
Living people
American anthropologists
University of California, Santa Cruz faculty
Stanford University alumni
Harvard University alumni
Annual Reviews (publisher) editors